Gabrielle Andrews and Taylor Townsend were the defending champions having won the 2012 event, but neither player chose to defend their title.

Barbora Krejčíková and Kateřina Siniaková won the tournament, defeating Belinda Bencic and Sara Sorribes Tormo in the final, 6–3, 6–4. This was the Czech pair's third Grand Slam victory in a row. Krejčíková became the fourth girls' doubles player to reach all of the Grand Slam finals in a calendar year after Anastasia Pavlyuchenkova, Urszula Radwańska and Tímea Babos.

Seeds

Draw

Finals

Top half

Bottom half

External links 
 Draw

Girls' Doubles
US Open, 2013 Girls' Doubles